Châteaurenault was a large protected cruiser built for the French Navy in the late 1890s and early 1900s. As such, Châteaurenault was built with a relatively light armament of just eight medium-caliber guns, but was given a long cruising range and the appearance of a large passenger liner, which would help her to evade detection while raiding merchant shipping.

Châteaurenault spent much of her early career overseas in French Indochina, deploying there immediately after her commissioning in 1902 through mid 1904, and then again in 1905–1906. She was reduced to reserve in 1907 and then modified to serve as a fast minelayer the following year. She was assigned to the Reserve Division of the Mediterranean Squadron. She saw little further activity until the outbreak of World War I in July 1914.

The ship was mobilized into the 2nd Light Squadron and based in the western English Channel. She was moved to the Mediterranean Sea in early 1915 and then to French Senegal to search for German commerce raiders in early 1916. Having been transferred back to the Mediterranean by October 1916, she rescued survivors from the troopship  that had been sunk by a German U-boat. Châteaurenault was herself torpedoed and sunk in December 1917, but she sank slowly enough for her crew to be taken off by a pair of destroyers, which in turn sank the German submarine.

Background and design
In the mid-1880s, elements in the French naval command argued over future warship construction; the  advocated building long-range and fast protected cruisers for use as commerce raiders on foreign stations while a traditionalist faction preferred larger armored cruisers and small fleet scouts, both of which were to operate as part of the main fleet in home waters.

These debates took place in the context of shifting geopolitical alliances and rivalries. The early 1890s was marked by serious strategic confusion in France; despite the Franco-Russian Alliance of 1891, which should have produced friction between the two countries and their imperial rival Britain, the French Navy was still oriented against the German-led Triple Alliance. This outlook was cemented in the naval program of 1894, but even the Navy's strategic planning remained muddled. These vessels were ideally suited to attack the extensive merchant shipping network of Britain, not the continental powers of Germany or Austria-Hungary.

Because the vessel was not intended to engage enemy cruisers, armament and armor could be kept light for a ship of this size. The  (Council of Works) issued its more detailed list of specifications to shipyards on 18 December 1894 to solicit design proposals.

The latter ship was designed by Antoine Lagane, and the finalized design was approved on 23 July. Lagane intended Châteaurenault to resemble a passenger liner, which would help her evade discovery while conducting commerce raiding operations. To this end, he gave the ship four tall and evenly spaced funnels and an overhanging stern, common features of liners of the day.

The French cruisers suffered from several defects, including insufficient speed to catch the fast transports that would be used to carry critical materiel in wartime and their vast expense militated against their use to attack low-value shipping. Additionally, their weak armament precluded their use against enemy cruisers. And Châteaurenault suffered from severe vibration at high speeds that could not be eliminated despite repeated attempts.

General characteristics and machinery

She displaced . Her hull had a long forecastle deck that extended almost her entire length; her stem was slightly sloped backward and she had an overhanging stern. Combined with her four raked and equally spaced funnels, her appearance was adopted to make it relatively easy to disguise her as a passenger liner while on commerce raiding patrols. Her lower hull had straight sides, with a slight tumblehome above the waterline, rather than the pronounced tumblehome shape that characterized most other large French warships of the period.

The ship was fitted with a pair of light pole masts for observation and signalling purposes; they were also fitted with platforms for six searchlights. Her superstructure was fairly minimal, consisting of a conning tower and bridge structure forward and a smaller, secondary conning position aft. Her crew numbered 604 officers and enlisted men. French naval officers considered Châteaurenault to have improved handling characteristics over her predecessor Guichen. Most of her auxiliary equipment was electric-powered, apart from her boat hoists, which used steam from her propulsion system. Her electric plan consisted of four dynamos rated at 80 volts.

The ship's propulsion system consisted of three vertical triple-expansion steam engines driving three screw propellers. Steam was provided by fourteen coal-burning, Normand Sigaudy water-tube boilers. The boilers were divided into four boiler rooms, three groups of four and a fourth group of two. These were ducted into four funnels located amidships; the funnel number and arrangement was also selected to give her the appearance of a passenger liner.

Armament and armor

Despite her large size, Châteaurenault carried a relatively light armament, since she was intended to engage unarmed merchant vessels, not other cruisers. Her main battery consisted of two  M1893 45-caliber (cal.) quick-firing (QF) gun in single pivot mounts, fore and aft on the centerline, which fired a variety of shells, including solid cast iron projectiles, and explosive armor-piercing (AP) and semi-armor-piercing (SAP) shells. These were supported by a secondary battery of six  M1893 45-cal. QF guns. Two of these were carried in sponsons amidships, while the other four were in casemates on the main deck level, one pair abreast the conning tower and the other abreast the main mast. For close-range defense against torpedo boats, she was armed with a battery of ten  3-pounder Hotchkiss guns and five  1-pounder guns. All of the guns were supplied from individual magazines, with electrically or manually-operated shell hoists.

Armor protection consisted of Harvey steel. An anti-splinter deck was above the flat portion of the main deck with a cofferdam connecting it to the main deck. The ship's main guns were each fitted with gun shields that were 55 mm thick.

Service history

Châteaurenault was built at the  shipyard in La Seyne-sur-Mer, beginning with her keel laying on 23 May 1896. She was launched on 12 May 1898, and was commissioned to begin sea trials on 24 October 1899. which continued through October. While operating at high speed, the ship's engines suffered from excessive vibration; the brass bearings in her engines were found to be problematic, so they were replaced with steel bearings. The propeller shafts were entirely dismantled and rebuilt to ensure they were aligned properly in another attempt to rectify the vibration problems. The work delayed her completion by several months, and during speed tests in 1902, she reached . The ship was finally placed in full commission on 10 October 1902.

She was activated immediately after being commissioned for service in China to relieve the cruiser D'Entrecasteaux, and she sailed from Toulon on 30 October. On 7 November, Châteaurenault struck an uncharted rock off Phan Rang, French Indochina, and had to return to France for repairs. She was unable to depart Indochina until 12 March, when Guichen arrived to replace her. After arriving back in France, Châteaurenault was decommissioned for lengthy repairs, and she remained out of service until 1910. During this period out of service, in 1908, Châteaurenault was selected for conversion into a fast minelayer. The naval command believed her resemblance to a passenger liner would again help her to evade detection while laying minefields. The work was never actually carried out, however.

Châteaurenault was recommissioned on 15 January 1910, and just fifteen days later, she accidentally ran aground off Cape Spartel, Morocco in poor weather. The protected cruiser  and two tugboats refloated the ship and towed her to Gibraltar, and the armored cruiser  then towed her from Gibraltar to Toulon. By 1911, Châteaurenault had been assigned to the Reserve Division of the Mediterranean Squadron, based in Toulon. Châteaurenault thereafter became the flagship of the Training Division of the Atlantic, where she housed a school for boatswains. The ship served in this capacity through 1913.

World War I

At the start of World War I in August 1914, Châteaurenault was assigned to the 2nd Light Squadron, which was based in the English Channel. The ships then conducted a series of patrols in the English Channel in conjunction with a force of four British cruisers.

In April 1915, she was moved to the Mediterranean as the Allies expanded their naval operations in the area. In February 1916, she was sent to reinforce the 3rd Light Division, which consisted of Gloire, Gueydon, and Dupetit-Thouars. The unit was sent to Dakar in French Senegal to patrol for German commerce raiders operating in the south Atlantic. She joined in the search for the commerce raider  in September. Châteaurenault moved back to the eastern Mediterranean by October. On 4 October, the troopship , a converted passenger liner carrying more than 2,000 soldiers and crew to Greece, was torpedoed and sunk by a German U-boat. No distress signal could be sent before she rapidly sank, leaving thousands in the water; more than 1,300 died before Châteaurenault passed through the area the next day and picked up the survivors. As the threat of U-boats increased in late 1916, against which large cruisers were particularly vulnerable, the French naval command ordered Châteaurenault and the rest of the division to return home.

On 14 December 1917, Châteaurenault was steaming to Salonika carrying a contingent of 985 troops to take part in the Allied intervention in Greece. While passing into the Gulf of Corinth, she encountered the German U-boat UC-38, which hit Châteaurenault with a single torpedo, inflicting fatal damage. The only casualties were a small number of engine-room personnel who were killed by the torpedo explosion itself. UC-38 attempted to maneuver for a second shot while Châteaurenault began to sink, but Mameluck and Lansquenet launched depth charges that forced the U-boat to surface, where she was sunk by gunfire. The German survivors were also picked up by the destroyers, which carried them to Patras, before continuing on to disembark the 1,162 survivors from Châteaurenault at Itea.

Notes

References

 
 
 
 
 
 
 
 
 
 
 
 
 
 
 
 
 
 
 
 

Cruisers of the French Navy
Ships built in France
1898 ships
World War I cruisers of France
Maritime incidents in 1917
Ships sunk by German submarines in World War I
World War I shipwrecks in the Mediterranean Sea
Ships with du Temple boilers